Kiryat Eliezer Kaplan is a neighborhood in Netanya, Israel. It is named for the first Minister of Finance of Israel, Eliezer Kaplan.
（Under the jurisdiction of the Municipality of Netanya, it became an industrial zone. Now it is primarily referred to as the old industrial zone of Netanya after the creation of Kiryat Sapir just a stone's throw away.

Neighbourhoods of Netanya
Industrial parks in Israel